Gladys Lake Ecological Reserve is an ecological reserve located in the Eaglenest Range of the Spatsizi Plateau in north-central British Columbia, Canada. It was established in 1975 under the Ecological Reserves Act to facilitate scientific research of the region's alpine-subalpine ecosystems while discouraging outdoor recreation use. The reserve protects  of pristine wilderness and is the largest ecological reserve in British Columbia.

Geography
The reserve is an enclave within the larger Spatsizi Plateau Wilderness Provincial Park, though with stricter protections and limited public access.

See also
Todagin Wildlife Management Area

References

Provincial parks of British Columbia
1975 establishments in British Columbia
Protected areas established in 1975